Nasrullah Khan, or Amir Muhammad Nasrullah Bahadur Khan, was the Emir of Bukhara from 24 April 1827 to 1860. His father was emir Haydar bin Shahmurad (1800–1826).

Civil War 
After Haydar's death, Mir Hussein bin Haydar came to power. He died two months later and was succeeded by Umar bin Haydar. Civil war erupted between the forces of Umar and Nasrullah. From personal experience, Nasrullah knew in order to defeat Umar, he would need the support of the population of Samarqand and Miyankal (a region between Samarqand and Bukhara). One of his first actions was to enter Samarqand and gaining the support of the local leadership. Then he marched throughout the Zarafshan Valley, where local Uzbek tribes and clans submitted to him along the way.

Reign 
Nasr-Allah bin Haydar Tora was ruler in a time when the Central Asian states were under pressure from the advance of the Russian Empire in the north and the British Indian Empire in the south. Nasr-Allah is best known in the West as the Emir who imprisoned and eventually executed in 1842 the British envoys Charles Stoddart and Arthur Conolly, and imprisoned but eventually released Joseph Wolff, who came in 1843 to seek news of them.

Emirate of Bukhara – Kokand Khanate wars

Nasrullah bin Haydar Tora organized several unsuccessful military campaigns against the Kokand Khanate. In 1839, he declared war against Kokand due to their building of the Pishagar fort near the Bukhara front. He conquered Khojand twice in 1839 and 1841, forcing the Khan of Kokand into a peace in his favour and took Ura Tepe and Khojend as compensation. The Khan of Kokand was also forced to pay a heavy amount and recognize him as lord, putting his name on the coins and the khutba. After a revolt in Khujent, the Emir's forces occupied Khojent and Kokand. Madali Khan, the Khan of Kokand, escaped to Marghilan, but was captured and executed in Bukhara at the end of April 1842. Nasrullah also personally ordered the execution of Ali-Khan and Nodira of Kokand along with most of their families. Bukharan forces in the Khanate of Kokand were expelled after a revolt in Kokand two months later.

Nasr-Allah bin Haydar Tora died in 1860 and his son Muzaffar bin Nasrullah (1860–1885) came to power.

References

Fitzroy Maclean: A Person from England and Other Travellers, 1958
Fitzroy Maclean, Eastern Approaches, chap. 6 "Bokhara the Noble", 1949.
Joseph Wolff: Narrative of a Mission to Bokhara, in the years 1843-1845, to ascertain the fate of Colonel Stoddart and Captain Conolly. London, J. W. Parker, 1845.
Wilde, Andreas: What is Beyond the River?: Power, Authority, and Social Order in Transoxania 18th-19th Centuries, Volume 2. Austrian Academy of Sciences, 2016.

Emirs of Bukhara
1860 deaths
19th-century monarchs in Asia
People from Bukhara
1806 births